The Big Three is the nickname of the three most successful sports clubs in Belgium. The football teams of R.S.C. Anderlecht, Club Brugge KV and Standard Liège have a great rivalry, and are usually the main contenders for the title. Combined they share a total of 57 out of 113 Belgian Football Championships ever played and generally end up sharing the top three positions. None of them have been relegated from the First Division A either, since promotion to the top flight.

Several other clubs outside the big three have won the Belgian league, with Union SG having the third most national titles behind Anderlecht and Club Brugge in Belgium with 11 in total; one title more than Standard Liège. Today, the chief competitors of the three are KAA Gent and Racing Genk.

See also 
 Big Three (Costa Rica)
 Big Three (Greece)
 Big Three (Netherlands)
 Big Three (Peru)
 Big Three (Portugal)
 Big Three (Turkey)

References 

Football in Belgium
Club Brugge KV
R.S.C. Anderlecht
Standard Liège